Dicle Nur Babat (born 15 September 1992 in Kırklareli) is a Turkish volleyball player.

Career
Dicle Nur Babat began playing volleyball in the feeder team of Eczacıbaşı. After three years, she transferred to the feeder team of Vakıfbank. In the 2011-12 season, she was loaned out to Nilüfer Belediyesi in Bursa. The next season, she signed with Beşiktaş returning to Istanbul again. At the end of  the first season, her team was relegated to the Second League after losing the play-off game to Galatasaray. Her contract was extended for one year in the beginning of the 2013-14 season. Following the 2013-14 season, she enjoyed runner-up title at the CEV Women's Challenge Cup with Beşiktaş.

In the beginning of the 2014-15 season, she moved to Fenerbahçe.

She capped more than 75 times in the Turkey national team.

Honours
 Champions (7):
 2012 Women's Junior European Volleyball Championship
 2014-15 Turkish Women's Volleyball League
 2014-15 Turkish Women's Volleyball Cup
 2014-15 Turkish Super Cup
 2015 European Games
 2016-17 Turkish Women's Volleyball Cup
 2016-17 Turkish Women's Volleyball League
 Runner-up (1):
 2014 CEV Women's Challenge Cup

See also
 Turkish women in sports

References

External links
 Dicle Nur Babat profile at Fenerbahçe.org
 

1992 births
People from Kırklareli
Turkish women's volleyball players
Eczacıbaşı volleyball players
VakıfBank S.K. volleyballers
Nilüfer Belediyespor volleyballers
Beşiktaş volleyballers
Fenerbahçe volleyballers
European Games gold medalists for Turkey
European Games medalists in volleyball
Living people
Volleyball players at the 2015 European Games